The knockout phase of the 2010 CAF Confederation Cup began on 29 October 2010 and concluded on 4 December 2010.  The knockout phase involved the four teams who finished in the top two in each of their groups in the group stage.
Each tie was played over two legs, with each team playing one leg at home. The team that had the higher aggregate score over the two legs progressed to the next round. In the event that aggregate scores finish level, the team that scored more goals away from home over the two legs progressed. If away goals are also equal, the tie is decided by a penalty shoot-out – with no extra time being held.

Qualified teams

Semifinals

1–1 on aggregate. CS Sfaxien won on penalties.

2–2 on aggregate. FUS Rabat won on the away goals rule.

Final

FUS Rabat won 3–2 on aggregate.

References

Knock-out stage